Söder means South. It may also refer to:

Places in Sweden
Södermalm, a major district of central Stockholm
Söder, Malmö
Södermanland
Södertörn
Söderhamn Municipality
Söderköping Municipality
Södertälje Municipality

Places in Finland
Söderkulla, a village in the municipality of Sipoo

People with the surname
Björn Söder, Swedish MP
Karin Söder, Swedish statesman
Markus Söder, German politician
Robin Söder, Swedish footballer

Other uses
Soder Airlines
Söder tea

See also
Solder, a material used to bond metal pieces